All the Way is a studio/live cover album by Diamanda Galás, released in 2017. All the Way was one of two albums of hers released on March 24, 2017, the other being a live album named At Saint Thomas the Apostle Harlem. These albums consisted of Galás' first released material since 2008.

The album features six interpretations of blues, folk, and jazz standards. In advance of the album's release, the title track was available to stream via Soundcloud in January 2017.

Reception

Lottie Brazier of The Quietus stated in a non-rated positive review that the album "is particularly strong, however, for both the production of Galás' piano and its melodies – there is an added, foreboding subtlety which comes through with more clarity here."

Track listing

References

2017 albums
Diamanda Galás albums